Kameiros is a former municipality on the island of Rhodes, in the Dodecanese, Greece. Since the 2011 local government reform it has been part of the municipality of Rhodes, of which it is a municipal unit. The municipal unit lies on the northwest coast of Rhodes, stretching inland into the north-central part of the island.

The seat of the municipality was in Soroni (pop. 1,278 in 2011). Other large towns are Apóllona (845), Fanes (858), Salakos (571), and Kalavárda (502). It did not include the small port of Kameiros Skala, which was in Attavyros municipality (now municipal unit).  The municipal population was 4,720 at the 2011 census, and the land area is 211.825 km².

The municipality was named after the ancient city of Kameiros, which lies just west of Kalavarda.

References

External links
Official website 

Populated places in Rhodes